"Raymond" is a song co-written and recorded by American country music artist Brett Eldredge. It was released on September 27, 2010, as the first single from his debut studio album Bring You Back. Eldredge wrote the song with Brad Crisler.

Content
"Raymond" tells the story of a maintenance worker at a nursing home and his relationship with a patient with Alzheimer's disease, who believes that the maintenance worker is her son Raymond, who was a private killed in action in Vietnam in 1971.

Eldredge was inspired to write the song because his grandmother had Alzheimer's disease for several years.

Critical reception
Bobby Peacock of Roughstock gave the song four and a half stars out of five, calling it "one of those rare debut singles that gets your attention right away, while at the same time showing off a great deal of vocal and songwriting talent." The song also received a "thumbs up" from Engine 145 reviewer Janet Goodman, who wrote that it "is an impressive debut single with a vocal performance that blends earthiness with emotional highs, and a message that manages to remain sugar-free while leaving us with its hopeful refrain of kindness."

Music video
Shaun Silva directed the music video which premiered in October 2010.

Chart performance
"Raymond" debuted at number 52 on the U.S. Billboard Hot Country Songs chart for the week of October 16, 2010.

Year-end charts

References

Songs about the military
Songs about soldiers
Songs of the Vietnam War
2010 debut singles
2010 songs
Brett Eldredge songs
Atlantic Records singles
Songs written by Brad Crisler
Songs written by Brett Eldredge
Song recordings produced by Byron Gallimore
Music videos directed by Shaun Silva
Songs about mental health